Jami-Lee Matenga Ross (born 1985) is a former New Zealand  politician who was the Member of Parliament (MP) for the Botany electorate in Auckland from the March 2011 Botany by-election, when he became the youngest MP at the time, until 2020. He was previously a local government politician on the Auckland Council and, before that, was on the Manukau City Council from the age of 18.

After representing the National Party in parliament for seven years, Ross resigned from the party's caucus on 16 October 2018 after he accused National leader Simon Bridges of corruption. Ross has been accused of harassment and bullying behaviour toward staff. He sat in Parliament as an independent. Ross announced the establishment of a new political party, Advance New Zealand, in 2020. At the 2020 election, none of the party's candidates won an electorate seat and the party received less than 1% of the party vote, meaning Ross lost his seat in Parliament.

As of 2023, Ross' main occupation is running an escort service. He had earlier featured in a documentary series about New Zealand conspiracy theorists

Early life
Ross was brought up by his grandmother as his mother was "not in the best space to raise a child", and he has never met his father, who descends from the Māori iwi of Ngāti Porou. He attended Dilworth School, a boarding school for pupils from difficult backgrounds, then Pakuranga College, but left without formal qualifications. He holds a commercial pilot's licence from April 2012, having trained at Ardmore Flying School. He has also studied towards a politics and economics degree at the University of Auckland.

He is married to Lucy Schwaner, a former member of the Howick Local Board.

Early political career

Ross joined the National Party in 2003. He was elected to the Manukau City Council in 2004, aged 18, and worked as an electorate secretary in Pakuranga for MP Maurice Williamson.

He stood for a place on the new Auckland Council in the 2010 Auckland local elections, winning a seat for the Howick ward. He was subsequently elected co-leader of the Citizens & Ratepayers ticket. He resigned from the Council on 7 March 2011, after being elected to Parliament.

Member of Parliament

National Party, 2011–2018
On 27 January 2011, the National Party selected Ross as their candidate for the Botany by-election to be held on 5 March 2011, to fill a vacancy created by the resignation of Pansy Wong. He won the election with a majority of 3,972. Upon his swearing into Parliament Ross became the youngest Member of Parliament, taking the informal title of Baby of the House from Gareth Hughes, a Green Party MP.

In 2013, he supported and voted for the Marriage (Definition of Marriage) Amendment Bill, which legalised same-sex marriage in New Zealand.

Ross served as one of the National Party's whips in Parliament. He was appointed Third Whip in 2013, was promoted to Junior Whip after the 2014 election, and elected as Senior Whip after the incumbent Tim Macindoe was appointed as Minister of Customs in May 2017.

Simon Bridges expenses scandal and split with National
On 2 October 2018, Ross issued a statement that he was standing down from his portfolios and from the front bench of the Opposition due to personal health issues. His transport portfolio was picked up by Paul Goldsmith, and Judith Collins took over his infrastructure portfolio.

On 15 October 2018, National Leader Simon Bridges stated that Ross had been identified as the National Party leaker after the party's inquiry into the leaking of Bridges' travel expenses. Bridges said the inquiry report identified Ross as the most likely source of the leak, and he accepted that finding. Ross denied the accusations and issued a series of tweets prior to the press conference alleging that Bridges had attempted to silence him for speaking out against his leadership decisions, including an election donation that allegedly broke the law. Bridges also indicated that National would seek disciplinary action against Ross.

On 16 October, Ross alleged during a live press conference that Bridges was a corrupt politician who had violated electoral law several times, including accepting an illegal NZ$100,000 donation from Chinese businessman Zhang Yikun. Ross also publicly denied allegations that he had sexually harassed several female staff, claiming that Bridges and Deputy Leader Paula Bennett were trying to smear him and had pressed him into going away on medical leave. Ross also announced his resignation from the National Party, and his intention to step down as MP by the end of the week (Friday, 19 October), which would have trigged a by-election in his Botany electorate. That same day, the National Party caucus voted to expel Ross for disloyalty. Ross also tweeted photos showing Bridges and Zhang Yikun at a National Party event. Bridges denied Ross's allegations as baseless and said it was a matter for the police.

The following day, 17 October, Ross spoke to police in Wellington and soon after released an audio recording between himself and Bridges on Facebook. Notably, it included Bridges describing National List MP Maureen Pugh as "fucking useless". On 18 October, the news website Newsroom released an exclusive report, with four women accusing Ross of incoherent rages, harassment, and bullying behaviour. The women had spoken to Newsroom journalist Melanie Reid over a significant period before the recent media publicity around Ross's conflict with his former National colleagues.

On 19 October, Katrina Bungard, the National candidate for Manurewa, identified herself as one of the four women who had allegedly been harassed by Ross. She praised the way that National had dealt with the complaints and the other women for coming forward with the allegations. Ross indicated that he was seeking legal options. Later that day in an interview with Newstalk ZB journalist Heather Du Plessis Allan, Ross admitted to past extramarital affairs with two women – including a married MP. He also announced that he would not resign his seat in Parliament.

On 21 October, it was reported that Ross had been admitted to a mental health facility in Auckland by police. He was discharged two days later.

On 25 January 2019, Sarah Dowie was revealed as the MP Ross had had an affair with. Ross had disclosed this in October 2018, but the news media chose not to name her at the time. After it was learned that a police investigation had been launched into a text message allegedly sent by Dowie to Ross, media revealed her identity. If the message is found to breach the Harmful Digital Communications Act, it is punishable by up to three years in prison. On 31 July 2019, the Police declined to pursue charges against Dowie. Ross responded that he welcomed the conclusion of the inquiries, stating "this has been a traumatic time for many people. I am glad it is now behind us all."

SFO fraud investigation, 2019–2020
On 12 March 2019, it was reported that the New Zealand Police had referred Ross's complaint about Bridges' disclosure of political donations to the Serious Fraud Office. Bridges has denied any wrongdoing and asserted that it is a National Party matter.

On 29 January 2020 the Serious Fraud Office announced they had charged four people in relation to the claims made by Ross in 2018 around the $100,000 donation. None of the sitting National Party MPs at the time, including Simon Bridges, were among the four charged. On 19 February 2020, it was reported that Ross was one among four people charged by the SFO over a NZ$105,000 donation made to the National Party in June 2018. The SFO alleged that Ross and the other defendants had committed fraud by splitting the 2018 donation into sums of money less than $15,000, which were then transferred into the bank accounts of eight different people before being donated to the National Party. On 25 February, Ross appeared in court where he pleaded not guilty to the charges relating to the National Party donations.

Alleged foreign influence in New Zealand politics
In early March 2019, Jami-Lee Ross called for new regulations on foreign donations to political parties. Ross's statement was made in response to a Parliamentary hearing on alleged foreign interference in the 2017 New Zealand general election.

Bullying and sexual harassment allegations, February 2020
In early February 2020, the news website Newsroom reported that Ross was under investigation from Parliamentary Service for alleged bullying against staff members at his Botany electorate office, who had been placed on leave. Ross has denied any allegations of wrongdoing and claimed that the allegations levelled against him were part of a "wider, politically-motivated attack."

The parliamentary service investigation substantiated a number of complaints about his behaviour towards staff, including the existence of a "toxic environment", sexualised comments towards female staff members and "lies and mind games". Further investigation also revealed the married MP entered into at least two sexual relationships with his staffers, and that Ross would target a staffer with repeated pressure, controlling behaviour, "incoherent rages" and "brutal sex".

2020 general election

In April 2020, Ross declared that he would form a new political party, Advance New Zealand, which was formally launched on 26 July 2020. He also announced that Advance New Zealand would be merging with Billy Te Kahika's controversial New Zealand Public Party, which opposes mandatory vaccination, 5G technology, 1080 poison, fluoridation and electromagnets.

In late August, Ross and his Advance NZ/NZ Public Party coalition attracted controversy after they published a Facebook video alleging that the New Zealand Government had passed legislation forcing citizens to get a COVID-19 vaccine. According to Agence France-Presse's Fact Check, key parts of speeches made by other MPs were cut out and edited to distort what they were saying.  The video was controversial because it violated Parliamentary rules prohibiting the use of parliamentary debate videos for political campaigning. After Ross refused to remove the video, he was referred to the Parliamentary Privileges Committee by the Speaker of the House Trevor Mallard. On 1 September, the Parliamentary Privileges Committee unanimously agreed that Ross had broken the rules by misusing edited parliamentary TV video for political adverting. Ross rejected the committee's decision, denouncing them as a "kangaroo court".

On 15 September, Ross announced that he would no longer be contesting the seat of Botany at the election, which he had held as a National MP from 2011 to 2018, and then as an independent MP. Instead, Ross said he would campaign as a list-only candidate for the Advance Party.

During the 2020 New Zealand general election that was held on 17 October, Ross was not elected back into Parliament since the Advance NZ party only scored 1.0% of the popular vote (28,429), below the five percent margin needed to enter Parliament. The day after the election, Ross was interviewed by Newshub journalist Tova O'Brien, who criticised him for "peddling misinformation" about COVID-19 and challenged his decision to ally with Te Kahika's Public Party. Ross also stated that he planned to rest after the election. The interview attracted international and national media coverage with journalist Glenn Greenwald describing it as "an absolute masterclass in interviewing a politician".

Post-election activities

Wrapping up Advance New Zealand, 2020–2021
After Te Kahika severed relations with Advance NZ following the 2020 election, Ross announced that the Advance NZ party would undergo extensive restructuring with the goal of contesting the next general election in 2023. According to a Stuff report published on 26 October, Ross had dismissed concerns by senior party officials about irregularities with Te Kahika's donations (or koha) on the grounds that he had little prospect of being re-elected without Te Kahika's party. Ross had also reportedly threatened to resign if Te Kahika was removed over financial irregularities. Te Kahika subsequently issued a statement stating that he was not severing relations with Advance NZ but was rather restoring its "autonomy." He also vowed not to step down as party leader and to continue supporting Ross and Advance NZ.

In November 2020, Newsroom and Newshub reported that Ross and his Advance NZ party were locked in a dispute with Te Kahika's NZ Public Party concerning the ownership of party policies and funds stored within an ASB Bank account. On 6 November, Ross had sent Te Kahika a letter claiming copyright ownership over the policies that the two parties had co-written. Advance NZ also asserted that the funds within an ASB Bank belonged to them while Advance NZ claimed that the account was a shared account and that the NZ$60,000 belonged to them. On 13 November, Advance NZ's lawyer Graeme Edgeler proposed a settlement where Advance NZ would cover the costs of a newspaper advertisement and an election night party but warned they would pursue legal action if Te Kahika did not cease alleging that Ross and Advance NZ were guilty of theft and misconduct.

On 16 July 2021, the Advance New Zealand party issued a statement that it would dissolve and deregister as a political party.

Electoral fraud trial
In late July 2022, Ross was one of seven defendants in a High Court case involving three donations made to the Labour and National parties between 2017 and 2018. Ross and his co-defendants were accused of assisting businessman Yikun Zhang with concealing electoral donations. The Crown accused Ross of serving as Zhang's insider within the National Party when the latter made two donations worth over NZ$100,000 in 2017 and 2018. Under the Electoral Act 1993, all donations worth more than NZ$15,000 must be reported to the Electoral Commission. The trial took ten weeks. Zhang and two others were found guilty of fraud; the judge acquitted Ross on the grounds that it was possible that he was "so driven by a desire to take down Mr [Simon] Bridges that he lied in the most compelling way he could imagine, that is by falsely stating he had carried out Mr Bridges' instructions."

Documentary
In February 2023, the documentary film "Elements of Truth" was released by The Spinoff in collaboration with NZ On Air. The film, directed by Tony Sutoris of 1999's "Campaign", is a fly on the wall feature that explores the final 17 days of Ross and Advance New Zealand's failed 2020 campaign. It offered key insights into Ross's motives and rationales behind his alliance with Te Kahika and his movement, and the extent to which Ross truly believed the rhetoric espoused by the party that he co-led.

Businesses
In 2020, Ross founded a company called Praesidium Life to sell a nutritional supplement which claims to protect users from electromagnetic radiation. The supplement, called Praesidium, is a pseudoscientific medical treatment.

In 2022, Ross founded an escort agency called Sapphire Blue under the pseudonym Dylan Rose. As of March 2023 it employed over 20 women, mostly in their late teens and early twenties. Several of them have raised safety concerns.

References

Living people
1985 births
Members of the New Zealand House of Representatives
Independent MPs of New Zealand
New Zealand National Party MPs
New Zealand conspiracy theorists
Auckland Councillors
Māori politicians
Manukau City Councillors
Ngāti Porou people
New Zealand MPs for Auckland electorates
People educated at Pakuranga College
21st-century New Zealand politicians
Candidates in the 2017 New Zealand general election
People educated at Dilworth School
Unsuccessful candidates in the 2020 New Zealand general election
Māori MPs
New Zealand brothel owners and madams